Matthew Thomson (born 11 January 1986) is a 50 m Rifle shooter who won two gold medals at the 2006 ISSF World Shooting Championships. He won gold for the Junior Men's Prone competition with a score of 593 and also led the British Junior Men's team to its first gold in 24 years.

Career
Thomson began his career in 1996 as a school boy with the  Watsonian shooting club. While at university, he was involved with the University of Edinburgh rifle club as well as maintaining his link with Watsonians.

His career has taken him around the world where he has competed in Nordic, European and World competitions, as well as being crowned Scottish Senior Men's Prone Champion in 2004 and claiming the Scottish Junior Men's Prone Championship in both 2004 and 2005.

Thomson received his first GB Cap in 2004 as a Junior, representing Great Britain at the European Shooting Championships in the Junior Men's 50M Rifle Prone where he placed 29th. In 2006 he won the Junior Men's 50M Rifle Prone event at the  2006 World Shooting Championships, making him the World Junior Men's Prone Champion. He was also part of the Junior Men's Prone Team who won Britain's first Junior Team Gold in 24 years. Later in the year he went on to become the British Universities Long Range Champion at the 2006  BUSA Smallbore Rifle Championships.

In 2008 he won his first senior international medal when he won the Men's Prone at ISAS in Dortmund.

In 2012, Thomson won Bronze at the International Shooting Competition of Hannover whilst representing Great Britain. The Men's Prone Team comprising Thomson, James Huckle and Neil Stirton also took Silver.

Junior
Scottish Men's Prone Champion 2004 & 2005
World Junior Men's Prone Champion, 2006

Senior
Scottish Men's Prone Champion 2004
International Start of Season Match (ISAS) Men's Prone Champion 2008

References

External Links

 Scottish Smallbore Rifle Association (SSRA) Athlete Profile
 Scottish Smallbore Rifle Association (SSRA) News

1986 births
Living people
People educated at George Watson's College
Scottish male sport shooters
British male sport shooters
ISSF rifle shooters